Pak Nga is one of the 37 constituencies in the Kwun Tong District of Hong Kong which was created in 2007.

The constituency loosely covers part of Hong Pak Court and Hong Shui Court in Lam Tin with the estimated population of 13,020.

Councillors represented

Election results

2010s

2000s

References

Constituencies of Hong Kong
Constituencies of Kwun Tong District Council
2007 establishments in Hong Kong
Constituencies established in 2007
Lam Tin
Yau Tong